Cavalry are soldiers who fight while mounted on horses.

Cavalry may also refer to:

Cavalry (1936 American film), a 1936 American film directed by Robert N. Bradbury
Cavalry (1936 Italian film), a 1936 Italian film starring Amadeo Nazzari
Cavalry: Its History and Tactics, an 1860 book by Lewis Edward Nolan
Cavalry: Its History, Management, and Uses in War, an 1863 book by Jean Roemer
Cavalry (comics), a Marvel comics superhero team
In modern usage, the term "cavalry" is popularly applied to a person or persons who serve the role of last-minute savior or back-up. Upon this particular person or persons' arrival, it is usually exclaimed that: "The Cavalry has arrived!".
 Cavalry FC, a soccer club from Calgary in the Canadian Premier League

See also

Cavalry Division (disambiguation)
Light cavalry
Heavy cavalry